Sangli district (Marathi pronunciation: [saːŋɡli]) is a district of Maharashtra state in India. Sangli city is the district headquarters. It is bordered by Satara district, Solapur district to the North, Karnataka state to South-East, by Kolhapur district to South-West and by narrow portion in East side to Ratnagiri district. It is present on the southern tip of Maharashtra.

The district is 25.11% urban. Sangli and Miraj are the largest cities. The second oldest industrial Township like Kirloskarwadi (Palus) is also located in the  Sangli District. Industrialist Laxmanrao Kirloskar started his first factory here. It is known as the sugar bowl of India due to its high sugarcane productivity. Sangli District is one of the most fertile and highly developed districts in Maharashtra. The District is very popular as a political power house in the state. It has provided many politicians and bureaucrats and is often referred to as the Heaven of Farmers.

Officer

Members of Parliament

Sanjaykaka Patil (BJP) 
Sangli (Lok Sabha constituency)

Guardian Minister

list of Guardian Minister

District Magistrate/Collector

list of District Magistrate / Collector

History
The district of Sangli is a recent creation, being made as late as in 1949. It was then known as South Satara and it has been renamed as Sangli since 1961. It is partly made up of a few talukas which once formed part of the old Satara District and partly of the States and jahagirs belonging to Patvardhans, and Dafles which came to be merged during the post-independence period. Kundal, the region around Sangli, was the capital of the Chalukyas. Kundal was an ancient village, around 1,600 years old. Kaundanyapur (its old name) was a part of Karnataka. Kundal was the home of freedom fighters like Krantisigha Nana Patil, Krantiveer Captain Akaram (dada) Pawar, Shyamrao Lad, Captain Ramchandra Lad, G.D. Lad, Shankar Jangam and Husabai Jangam.

Geography
Sangli District is located in the western part of Maharashtra. It is bounded by Satara and Solapur districts to the north, Bijapur District (Karnataka) to the east, Kolhapur and Belgaum (Karnataka) districts to the south, and Ratnagiri District to the west.

Sangli District is situated in the river basins of the Warna and Krishna rivers. Other small rivers, such as the Warana River and the Panchganga, flow into the River Krishna. Land in the region is suitable for agriculture.

Sangli district has distinct kind of environment. Eastern talukas of Shirala, Walwa, Palus are famous for high rainfall and floods. 2005 floods submerged many villages like Dudhondi, Bhilawadi , amnapur, Punadi, Khed, walwa etc.

Western talukas are famous for drought and tanker driven drinking water supply systems. But recent projects like Tembhu-Mhaisal yojana, Takari prakalp ( located in takari town & water lifted & stored in Sagareshwar wildlife sanctuary area), Vita water scheme (located in Dudhondi and Ghogoan village) are changing the water landscape of these talukas. These water projects are located on river Krishna.

Sagareshwar Wildlife Sanctuary is a protected area in the Indian state of Maharashtra. It is located at the meeting of three Tehsils of Sangli district: Kadegaon, Walva and Palus. The wildlife sanctuary is man-made; it is an artificially cultivated forest without a perennial supply of water, and most of the wildlife species were artificially introduced. It has an area of 10.87 km².

Tourism 
The sanctuary is a popular tourist destination, with the peak tourism season being from August to February. The most popular tourist activity is hiking to the top of a hill in the sanctuary, from which one can see the Krishna River flowing through fields of sugarcane and grapevines. Also in the area are numerous shrines to Shiva which were built during the Chalukya dynasty,  and Kundal is the region around Sangli, was the capital of the Chalukyas. Kundal is a historical place.

About Sagareshwar 

The Sagareshwar sanctuary has much religious, cultural and archaeological significance. The sanctuary derives its name from an ancient famous Shiva temple that attracts many devotees. It actually consists of one large temple and a complex of 51 small temples, all from the Satvahana period. You will find the Kamal Bhairao temple, partially hewn from hard Basalt rock perched on the edge of a steep cliff. The entrance to the temple is through a narrow trench.

Demographics

According to the 2011 census Sangli District has a population of 2,822,143, roughly equal to the nation of Jamaica or the US state of Kansas. This gives it a ranking of 137th in India (out of a total of 640). Its population growth rate over the decade 2001–2011 was 9.18%. Sangli has a sex ratio of 964 females for every 1000 males, and a literacy rate of 82.62%. 25.49% of the population lived in urban areas. Scheduled Castes and Scheduled Tribes make up 12.51% and 0.65% of the population respectively.

Hinduism is followed by 86.47% of district population. Islam is second largest religion in Sangli district followed by 8.49% of district population. There are significant Jain minorities of 3.1% in Sangli city.

At the time of the 2011 Census of India, 85.97% of the population in the district spoke Marathi, 5.09% Kannada, 4.73% Hindi and 2.38% Urdu as their first language.

Administration
Sangli District is composed of 10 talukas, listed below with their populations at the 2011 Census:

 Shirala (162,911)
 Walwa (456,002)
 Palus (164,909)
 Kadegaon (143,019)
 Khanapur (Vita) (170,214)
 Atpadi (138,455)
 Tasgaon (251,401)
 Miraj (854,581)
 Kavathe Mahankal (152,327)
 Jat, Sangli (328,324)

Culture
Kundal is near Veerbhadra Temple Hill. This temple has 300 years of history. Kundal is a pilgrimage centre for the Digambar Jains, with thousands of Jains visiting each year. There is a temple built in the memory of Maharaja Jaising.

Kundal is surrounded by hills, including Zari Parshwanath. Water from the trough cascades near the idol of Mahaveer. Two caves house the idol of Mahaveer and the images of Rama, Sita, and Lakshman. Samav Sharan, a large open space on top of another hill, is considered holy by the Jains. They believe that Mahaveer gave sermons to his followers here.

Another village,Dudhondi (sharing boundary with kundal), is famous for Shiv-Bhavani temple. This is only second temple with idols of maratha king Shivaji & goddess Bhavani in Maharashtra. First one is at Tuljapur, Usmanabad. 

Shri-kshetra (religious place) Audumbur has a temple dedicated to Shri-guru-Datta.

Notable people

Social Reformers/ Freedom fighters

 Vasantdada Patil
 Nagnath Naikwadi
 Annabhau Sathe 
 Gopal Ganesh Agarkar 
 Gulabrao Patil
 गणपत लाड (G D BAPU LAD)
 Karmveer Bhaurao Patil 
 Dhulappa Bhaurao Navale
 Rajarambapu patil
Mahavir Pandurang Salunkhe
Saints

Loknath swami

Entertainment/ literature/ culture/ music/ cinema
 Bal Gandharva 
 Asha Bhosale 
 Patthe Bapurao
 Gajanan Digambar Madgulkar 
 Vishnudas Bhave 
 Sai Tamhankar
 Vyankatesh Digambar Madgulkar
Vinayak Mahadev Kulkarni
Shankarrao Kharat

Sports
 Vijay Hazare
 Smriti Mandhana is from Madhavnagar
 Armaan Jaffer

Politics
 Yashwantrao Chavan
 Vasantdada Patil 
 Patangrao Kadam 
 Jayant Patil 
 R. R. Patil 
 Dhulappa Bhaurao Navale 
 Ramdas Athawale
 Vishwajeet Patangrao Kadam
 Sanjaykaka Patil
 Vasantrao Anandrao Naik
 Fattesing Anandrao Naik
 Nanasaheb Mahadik

Officers
 Vishwas Nangare Patil.(IPS)
 Rajaram Mane (IAS)
 Dr. Shrikar Keshav Pardeshi (IAS)
 Amit Khatavkar (IRS)
 Ganesh Tengale (IRS)

See also
 Bilashi
 Kadegaon
 Madhavnagar
 Miraj
 Palus
 Shirala
 Tasgaon

References

External links

 Official website of Sangli district
 Map of Sangli district
 Laxminarayan Puratan Vastu Sanghralay Museum in Sangli
 

 
Districts of Maharashtra
Pune division